All the names on this list follow the Eastern order convention (family name first, given name second) for consistency.

In the People's Republic of China, the Premier is the head of government, and is elected by a delegation of the National People's Congress every five years. Premiers have been limited to two terms of five years since 1982.

List of Premiers 
The Premiership of PRC was created since the establishment of the People's Republic of China on 1 October 1949.

 Generations of leadership

Timeline

See also 

 Generations of Chinese leadership
 Grand chancellor (China)
 List of Chinese leaders
 List of premiers of China
 List of presidents of the People's Republic of China
 List of vice premiers of the People's Republic of China
 Paramount leader
 Vice President of the People's Republic of China

References 

People's Republic of China

Premiers
.Premiers
.Premiers

fr:Premier ministre de la République populaire de Chine
id:Perdana Menteri Republik Rakyat Cina